Acakyra is a genus of beetles in the family Cerambycidae, containing the following species:

 Acakyra iaguara Martins & Galileo, 1996
 Acakyra laterialba Martins & Galileo, 2001
 Acakyra nigrofasciata Martins & Galileo, 2001
 Acakyra ocellata Chemsak & Hovore, 2002

References

Acanthoderini